Imam Quli Khan (1582–1644) was the son of Din Muhammad Khan and the third ruler of the Bukhara Khanate, who reigned from 1611 to 1642.

Imam Quli Khan belonged to Ashtarkhanid dynasty. During the reign of Imam Quli Khan, the Bukhara khanate achieved the most significant power for the entire period of its existence. Despite a successful foreign policy, Imam Quli Khan was unable to completely overcome the internal contradictions in the state associated with the separatism of certain Uzbek tribes.
In 1615, Imam Quli Khan sent ambassadors to the descendant of Babur, Emperor Jahangir of India. The letter from Imam Quli Khan was accompanied by an additional letter from the descendant of the famous theologian Khoja Hashim Dagbedi. The ambassadors were greeted friendly and Jahangir sent gifts and a poem to Imam Quli Khan, which he composed himself.

In 1618, the Safavid Shah Abbas I sent ambassadors to Imam Quli Khan with an offer of friendship. In April 1619, the ambassador of Imam Quli Khan was solemnly received by the Safavid shah.

During the reign of Imam Quli Khan, a number of famous architectural masterpieces were built, such as the cathedral mosque and Tillya-Kari madrasah, Sherdor madrasah in Samarkand, Nodir-Divan-Begi madrasah in Bukhara and Samarkand, etc.

In the last years of his life, Imam Quli Khan began to see poorly and in 1642 he renounced the throne in favor of his brother Nadir Muhammad (1642-1645) and went on the Hajj. Imam Quli Khan visited the Safavid Shah, where the local artist Mo'en Mosavver painted his portrait.

Imam Quli Khan died in 1644 in Mecca and was buried in Medina.

References

Sources 
 Burton Audrey. The Bukharans. A dynastic, diplomatic and commercial history 1550−1702. — Curzon, 1997
 Robert D. McChesney. Central Asia vi. In the 16th-18th Centuries // Encyclopædia Iranica — Vol. V, Fasc. 2, pp. 176−193
 R. D. McChesney, Waqf in Central Asia: Four Hundred Years in the History of a Muslim Shrine, 1480—1889. Princeton university press, 1991

Khanate of Bukhara
17th-century rulers in Asia
1582 births
1644 deaths